Kristian Adams (born 26 November 1976) is a former English professional cricketer who played for Kent County Cricket Club and Lincolnshire County Cricket Club as a bowler. He was a right-handed batsman and a left-arm medium-fast bowler. He was born in Grimsby in Lincolnshire.

Cricket career
Adams made his debut for the Kent First XI in May 2000, playing in eight List A matches and in a single first-class match during the season. He took two first-class wickets in his only County Championship match, including that of England Test batsman Graham Thorpe. He was released by Kent at the end of the 2001 season.

Adams had played for Lincolnshire in 1997 and went on to represent his native county again in 2002 and 2004 in the Minor Counties Championship and in one List A match in the 2002 Cheltenham & Gloucester Trophy. He also made appearances for the Second XI's of Leicestershire, Sussex and Hampshire.

References

External links
 

1976 births
People from Cleethorpes
English cricketers
Living people
Kent cricketers
Lincolnshire cricketers